Stefan Mastaller (born 7 April 1995) is an Austrian racing cyclist, who currently rides for UCI Continental team . He rode in the men's points race at the 2020 UCI Track Cycling World Championships.

References

External links

1995 births
Living people
Austrian male cyclists
Austrian track cyclists
Cyclists from Vienna
21st-century Austrian people